"Mobile Bay" is a song written by Curly Putman and David Kirby and originally recorded by Johnny Cash for his Billy Sherrill–produced 1981 album The Baron.

Released in July 1981 as a single (Columbia 18-02189, with "The Hard Way" on the B-side), the song reached number 60 on U.S. Billboard country chart for the week of August 15, 1981.

Track listing

Charts

References

External links 
 "Mobile Bay" on the Johnny Cash official website

Johnny Cash songs
1981 songs
1981 singles
Songs written by Curly Putman
Song recordings produced by Billy Sherrill
Columbia Records singles